This is a list of Iranian foods and dishes. Iranian cuisine (Including Persian cuisine) comprises the cooking traditions of Iran. Iran's culinary culture has historically interacted with the cuisines of the neighboring regions, including Caucasian cuisine, Turkish cuisine, Levantine cuisine, Greek cuisine, Central Asian cuisine, and Russian cuisine. Through the various Persianized Muslim sultanates and the Central Asian Mughal dynasty, aspects of Iranian cuisine were also adopted into Indian and Pakistani cuisines.

Typical Iranian main dishes are combinations of rice with meat, vegetables, and nuts. Herbs are frequently used, along with fruits such as plums, pomegranates, quince, prunes, apricots, and raisins. Characteristic Iranian flavorings such as saffron, dried lime and other sources of sour flavoring, cinnamon, turmeric, and parsley are mixed and used in various dishes.

Outside Iran, Iranian cuisine is especially found in cities of the Iranian diaspora such as London, the San Francisco Bay Area, Toronto, Houston and especially Los Angeles and its environs.

Iranian foods

Bread

Rice

Polow and dami

Kebab

Stew

Soup and āsh

Other

Appetizers

Desserts

Snacks

Drinks

See also 

 Lists of foods
 Iranian cuisine

References

External links 

 10 BEST PERSIAN FOODS THAT YOU’VE GOT TO TRY

Iranian cuisine
Lists of foods by nationality